Communist Party of Honduras was a communist party in Honduras. PCH was refounded on October 10, 1954 by Ramos Dionisio Bejarano and Rigoberto Padilla Rush. It had its roots in the Honduran Revolutionary Democratic Party. From the beginning, he maintained a strong presence in the workers union movement, especially the banana movement against the UFCO activities in Honduras.

History

1928-1932 
The first Communist Party of Honduras was founded in 1928 by Manuel Calix Herrera and Juan Pablo Wainwright Nuila, who had attempted to found a Socialist Party of Honduras a year earlier. The first Plenum of the Communist Party of Honduras was held in the house of Juan Pablo Wainwright in 1930.

1931 elections 
The Communist Party of Honduras would participate in the presidential elections of which Tiburcio Carías Andino would be the winner. The first Communist Party of Honduras was dissolved with the execution of Juan Pablo Wainwright, in 1932, by the dictatorship of Jorge Ubico of Guatemala and the death of Manuel Calix Herrera, in 1935.

1954-1990 
PCH reborn in 1954 and was claimed by the government to be an illegal party. It developed a strong presence in the trade union movement, for example amongst banana plantations. In the mid-1960s, the U.S. State Department estimated the party membership to be approximately 2400. However in 1965 the party split into two factions because of the Sino-Soviet split. The party was between the traditionalists who supported the USSR and those who supported the Maoist model of the People's Republic of China.

Dissolution 
In 1990, PCH was dissolved, and merged into Patriotic Renovation Party.The party was reactivated during the celebration of its fifth Congress in 2011.

See also 

 Central American crisis

References

External links
US Library of Congress study

1954 establishments in Honduras
1990 disestablishments in North America
2001 establishments in Honduras
Communist parties in Honduras
Formerly banned communist parties
Political parties disestablished in 1990
Political parties established in 1954
Political parties established in 2011
Political parties in Honduras